FC More Feodosia (Futbol′nyy klub More Feodosia) was a football club from Feodosia, Ukraine. 

The club existed before transfer of Crimea as FC More Yuzhnaya Tochka. Sometimes in 1952 it moved to a town of Prymorskyi where it played until 1989. Just before dissolution of the Soviet Union, it moved to the main city of Feodosia in 1989 and in 1992 was admitted to the 1992 Ukrainian Transitional League. The club was not successful and soon was relegated to regional competitions in 1993. Sometimes after that it was dissolved.

In 1992 and 1992–93 it participated in semi-professional competitions of Ukrainian league competitions. After 1993 More withdrew from competitions. Its games the club played in Prymorsky, Feodosia municipal commune.

The club was overshadowed after 1995 by another club FC Kafa that existed in 1995-2008 and competed at the Crimea regional competitions.

League and cup history

Soviet Union
{|class="wikitable"
|-bgcolor="#efefef"
! Season
! Div.
! Pos.
! Pl.
! W
! D
! L
! GS
! GA
! P
!Domestic Cup
!colspan=2|Europe
!Notes
|- bgcolor=SteelBlue
|align=center|1989
|align=center|4th KFK Ukrainian SSR Gr. 4
|align=center|4/13
|align=center|24
|align=center|13
|align=center|5
|align=center|6
|align=center|30
|align=center|15
|align=center|31
|align=center|
|align=center|
|align=center|
|align=center bgcolor=brick|Reorganization of competitions
|- bgcolor=SteelBlue
|align=center|1990
|align=center|5th KFK Ukrainian SSR Gr. 5
|align=center bgcolor=tan|3/16
|align=center|30
|align=center|20
|align=center|7
|align=center|3
|align=center|43
|align=center|12
|align=center|47
|align=center|
|align=center|
|align=center|
|align=center|
|- bgcolor=SteelBlue
|align=center|1991
|align=center|5th KFK Ukrainian SSR Gr. 4
|align=center bgcolor=tan|3/16
|align=center|30
|align=center|18
|align=center|8
|align=center|4
|align=center|53
|align=center|20
|align=center|44
|align=center|
|align=center|
|align=center|
|align=center bgcolor=brick|Reorganization of competitions
|}

Ukraine
{|class="wikitable"
|-bgcolor="#efefef"
! Season
! Div.
! Pos.
! Pl.
! W
! D
! L
! GS
! GA
! P
!Domestic Cup
!colspan=2|Europe
!Notes
|- align=center bgcolor=PowderBlue
|align=center|1992
|align=center|3rd Transitional League Gr. B
|align=center|9/9
|align=center|16
|align=center|1
|align=center|3
|align=center|12
|align=center|2
|align=center|25
|align=center|5
|align=center|
|align=center|
|align=center|
|align=center bgcolor=brick|Reorganization of competitions
|- bgcolor=SteelBlue
|align=center|1992-93
|align=center|4th Transitional League
|align=center bgcolor=pink|17/18
|align=center|34
|align=center|7
|align=center|8
|align=center|19
|align=center|19
|align=center|39
|align=center|22
|align=center|
|align=center|
|align=center|
|align=center bgcolor=pink|Relegated
|- bgcolor=SteelBlue
|align=center|1993-94
|align=center|5th Amateur League Gr. 6
|align=center|15/17
|align=center|32
|align=center|10
|align=center|2
|align=center|20
|align=center|26
|align=center|14
|align=center|22
|align=center|
|align=center|
|align=center|
|align=center bgcolor=lightgrey|Withdrew
|}

External links
 FC More Feodosia. Footballfacts.ru

Defunct football clubs in Crimea
Association football clubs established in 1989
Association football clubs disestablished in 2011
1989 establishments in Ukraine
2011 disestablishments in Ukraine